Louieville is a town in Ehlanzeni District Municipality in the Mpumalanga province of South Africa. It was the capital of KaNgwane, a non-independent bantustan.

References

Populated places in the Nkomazi Local Municipality